The Power of Good: Nicholas Winton is a 2002 documentary about Nicholas Winton, the man who organized the Kindertransport rescue mission of 669 children from German-occupied Czechoslovakia on the eve of the Second World War. Director Matej Mináč was inspired by meeting Winton while developing the film treatment for All My Loved Ones.

See also
Into the Arms of Strangers: Stories of the Kindertransport
The Children Who Cheated the Nazis

Awards
Best Documentary - International Emmy Awards (2002)
Trilobit Prize Czech Republic (2002)
Slovak Film Critics Prize IGRIC (2002)
Christopher Award for Film that Affirms the Highest Values of the Human Spirit (2006)

References

External links
 

2002 films
2002 documentary films
Kindertransport
Documentary films about the Holocaust
Documentary films about child refugees
Czech documentary films
Slovak documentary films
Czech World War II films
2000s English-language films